The Ontario Hockey League (OHL) is one of the three major junior ice hockey leagues which constitute the Canadian Hockey League. The league is for players aged 16–19. There are exceptions for overage players of 20 years of age. There are currently 20 teams in the OHL; seventeen in Ontario, two in Michigan, and one in Pennsylvania.

The league was founded in 1980 when its predecessor, the Ontario Major Junior Hockey League, formally split away from the Ontario Hockey Association, joining the Canadian Major Junior Hockey League and its direct affiliation with Hockey Canada. The OHL traces its history of Junior A hockey back to 1933 with the partition of Junior A and B.  In 1970, the OHA Junior A League was one of five Junior A leagues operating in Ontario. The OHA was promoted to Tier I Junior A for the 1970–71 season and took up the name Ontario Major Junior Hockey League. Since 1980 the league has grown rapidly into a high-profile marketable product, with many games broadcast on television and radio.

In March 2005, the league announced the launch of OHL Live Stream, resulting in OHL games being broadcast live on a pay-per-view (PPV) broadband basis.

History

Leagues for ice hockey in Ontario were first organized in 1890 by the newly created Ontario Hockey Association (OHA).  In 1892 the OHA recognized junior hockey - referring to skill rather than age. In 1896 the OHA moved to the modern age-limited junior hockey concept, distinct from senior and intermediate divisions.  Since then the evolution to the Ontario Hockey League has developed through four distinct eras of junior-aged non-professional hockey in Ontario. In 1933, the junior division was divided into two levels, Junior A and Junior B. In 1970 the Junior A level was divided into two levels, Tier I (or Major Junior A) and Tier II (or Minor Junior A). In 1974 the Tier I/Major Junior A group separated from the OHA and became the independent Ontario Major Junior Hockey League (OMJHL). In 1980, the OMJHL became the Ontario Hockey League.

The OHL split from the OHA in July 1982. The OHA and OHL disagreed on financial terms of affiliation, then the OHL decided to handle its own administration. The OHA and the OHL later reached an interim affiliation agreement, which allowed the OHL to compete at the Memorial Cup.

Commissioners
OMJHL and OHL Commissioners (years in office)
 Tubby Schmalz (September 23, 1974December 15, 1978)
 Bill Beagan (December 15, 1978January 1979)
 Sherwood Bassin (interim; JanuarySeptember 1979)
 David Branch (September 17, 1979present)

Member teams

Former teams
 Cornwall Royals 1981–1992, moved to Newmarket
 Newmarket Royals 1992–1994, moved to Sarnia
 Niagara Falls Flyers 1980–1982, moved to North Bay
 North Bay Centennials 1982–2002, moved to Saginaw
 Brantford Alexanders 1980–1984, moved to Hamilton
 Hamilton Steelhawks 1984–1988, moved to Niagara Falls
 Niagara Falls Thunder 1988–1996, moved to Erie
 Guelph Platers 1980–1989, moved to Owen Sound
 Toronto Marlboros 1980–1989, moved to Hamilton
 Dukes of Hamilton 1989–1991, moved to Guelph
 Detroit Junior Red Wings 1992–1995, became the Detroit Whalers
 Detroit Whalers 1995–1997, moved to Plymouth
 Plymouth Whalers 1997–2015, moved to Flint
 Brampton Battalion 1998–2013, moved to North Bay
 Mississauga IceDogs 1998–2007, moved to St. Catharines
 Toronto St. Michael's Majors 1996–2007, played in Mississauga until 2012
 Belleville Bulls 1981–2015, moved to Hamilton

Timeline of franchises (since 1980)
Note: The 12 original OHL franchises were all previously members of the OMJHL. Some other franchises played in different junior leagues prior to joining the OHL.

Schedule

The 20 OHL clubs play a 68-game unbalanced schedule, which starts in the third full week of September, running until the third week of March. Ninety percent (90%) of OHL games are scheduled between Thursday and Sunday to minimize the number of school days missed for its players.

Approximately 20% of players on active rosters in the National Hockey League (NHL) have come from the OHL, and about 54% of NHL players are alumni of the Canadian Hockey League.

OHL playoffs and Memorial Cup
The J. Ross Robertson Cup is awarded annually to the winner of the Championship Series. The Cup is named for John Ross Robertson, who was president of the Ontario Hockey Association from 1901 to 1905.

The OHL playoffs consist of the top 16 teams in the league, 8 from each conference.  The teams play a best-of-seven game series, and the winner of each series advances to the next round. The final two teams eventually compete for the J. Ross Robertson Cup.

The OHL champion then competes with the winners of the Western Hockey League, the Quebec Major Junior Hockey League, and the host of the tournament to play for the Memorial Cup, which is awarded to the junior hockey champions of Canada. The host team of the tournament is alternated between the three leagues every season. The most recent OHL team to win the Memorial Cup was the Windsor Spitfires in 2017.

Memorial Cup champions
The Memorial Cup has been captured 17 times by OHL/OHA teams since the tournament went to a three-league format in 1972:

The Cup was also won 16 times by OHA teams in the period between 1945 and 1971:

Priority selection
The OHL's predecessor, the OHA, had a midget and juvenile draft dating back to the 50s, until voted out in 1962. In 1966 it was resumed, though not publicized. Starting in the 1970s the draft went through several changes. Originally the draft was for 17-year-old midgets not already associated with teams through their sponsored youth programs. In 1971 the league first allowed "underage" midgets to be picked in the first three rounds. In 1972 disagreements about the Toronto team's rights to its "Marlie" players (and Greg Neeld) and claims to American player Mark Howe led to a revised system. In 1973 each team was permitted to protect eight midget area players (Toronto was allowed to protect 10 players from its midget sponsored teams). In 1975 the league phased out the area protections, and the 1976 OHA midget draft was the first in which all midget players were eligible. In 1999 the league changed the draft to a bantam age (15 and 16 year old). It is a selection of players who are residents of the province of Ontario, the states of Michigan, Pennsylvania and New York, and other designated U.S. states east of the Mississippi River plus Missouri.

Prior to 2001, the OHL held the Priority Selection in a public forum, such as an arena. Drafts were attended by many players and family members. In 2001, the OHL decided to hold the "draft" via the internet, greatly reducing the costs the league and its member teams incurred in hosting a public draft. This move reduced the stress and pressure that prospective players faced with a large crowd present.

The Jack Ferguson Award is presented annually to the first overall selection. The award was named in honour of long time OHL scout and former Director of Central Scouting Jack Ferguson.

Trophies and awards
List of trophies and awards in the Ontario Hockey League.

See also
List of OHL seasons
List of OHA Junior A standings

References

External links

Official website
Canadian Hockey League Official website
Internet Hockey Database archive of standings and statistics

 
1
3
Junior ice hockey leagues in the United States
Sports leagues established in 1974
1974 establishments in Ontario